Lodhi may refer to:

 Lodi (Pashtun tribe), a Batani Pashtun (Ghilzai) tribe mainly found in Afghanistan and Pakistan
 Lodhi dynasty of Delhi Sultanate
 Lodhi Colony, a residential colony in South Central part of New Delhi
 Lodhi Road, Delhi
 Lodhi (caste), a Hindu community in India 
 Lodha people, a tribal community of Odisha and West Bengal
 Lodha Muslims, a tribal community found in the state of West Bengal, India
 Lodhi language, a Austroasiatic spoken language of India

People
 
 
 Azhar Lodhi, newscaster and commentator at the Pakistan Television Corporation  
 Faheem Khalid Lodhi, Pakistani-Australian architect
 Lodhi (rapper), Pakistani hip-hop artist and desi rapper
 Maleeha Lodhi, journalist, academic and diplomat from Pakistan
 Shaista Lodhi, a Pakistani actor, director and host

See also
 Lodi (disambiguation)
 Lodha, synonym of the above Indian communities
 Sultanpur Lodhi, a city in the Indian state of Punjab
 Lohri, a Punjabi festival